Nandini Bajpai is a Boston-based author of Indian origin. Her debut young adult novel "Red Turban White Horse: My sister's hurricane wedding" was published by Scholastic India in 2013. Bajpai's book, Starcursed, a historical young adult novel, was published by Rupa Publications in November 2013. Her book Rishi and the Karmic Cat is middle grade (for children aged 9 and up) was published by Rupa Publications in September 2015. In November 2017 Nikki Garcia at Little, Brown bought Nandini Bajpai's contemporary YA novel A Match Made in Mehendi for publication in spring 2019. A Match Made in Mehendi was released in September 2019  and received good industry reviews including a starred review from Publishers Weekly. Her young adult novel “Sister of the Bollywood Bride” was acquired by Little Brown/Poppy for a summer 2021 release.

Personal life
Nandini Chauhan was born in Meerut UP in a Rajput family. Her father was a military officer and she has three sisters. The youngest of the four Chauhan sisters is the well known Indian writer, Anuja Chauhan. Nandini immigrated to Australia with her family in 1991. In 1994, after her marriage, she moved to the US. She worked at Fidelity Investments in Boston until the birth of her first child. After that she became involved in volunteering with several community and animal rescue groups while also starting to write. She was nominated for the India New England Woman of the Year award in 2015.

See also

Children's literature

References

External links
nandinibajpai.com

Living people
Indian children's writers
Women writers from Uttar Pradesh
English-language writers from India
Delhi University alumni
Delhi Public School alumni
Indian women children's writers
People from Meerut
21st-century Indian women writers
21st-century Indian writers
Indian women novelists
21st-century Indian novelists
Novelists from Uttar Pradesh
Year of birth missing (living people)